Kurt Ludwig Adelberger is an American astrophysicist and sustainability manager, who formerly worked at Google as a principal in energy and sustainability and was previously the Engagement Manager for McKinsey & Company.

Education
He earned his B.S. at Harvey Mudd College and a Ph.D. from the California Institute of Technology, where he was advised by Charles C. Steidel. His thesis was entitled Star formation and structure formation at redshifts 1 < z < 4 and has been cited in 31 other papers. He defended his thesis in 2001.

Research and career
Prior to working at Mckinsey & Company, Adelberger worked at Carnegie Observatories. He has published 194 papers in the field of astrophysics, and has been cited over 2000 times. In 2000, Adelberger was named a junior fellow of Harvard University.

Selected publications
His notable publications include Lyman-Break Galaxies at z 4 and the Evolution of the Ultraviolet Luminosity Density at High Redshift, cited by 1945 other articles and Spectroscopic confirmation of a population of normal star-forming galaxies at redshifts z> 3 cited by 1766 other articles. He has spoken at GreenBiz on how distributed generation will influence grid evolution. He also holds the patent for a thermostat system which allows the user to specify a range of acceptable temperatures.

References

American astrophysicists
Living people
Year of birth missing (living people)
California Institute of Technology alumni
Harvey Mudd College alumni